A marsh is a type of wetland.

Marsh may also refer to:

Places 
 Marsh, Buckinghamshire, England, a hamlet
 Marsh, Devon, a village in the Blackdown Hills, Devon, England
 Marsh, Huddersfield, West Yorkshire, England, a suburb of Huddersfield
 Marsh, the former name of Avon, Contra Costa County, California, United States
 Marsh Barton, Exeter, England
 Marsh Creek (disambiguation), United States
 Marsh Gibbon, Buckinghamshire, England
 Marsh Glacier, Ross Dependency, Antarctica
 Marsh Island (disambiguation)
 Marsh Lake (disambiguation)
 Marsh Lock, a lock and weir on the River Thames, England
 Marsh River (disambiguation)
 Marsh Township (disambiguation)

Arts and entertainment
 The Marsh (2002 film)
 The Marsh (2006 film)
 The Marshes (2018 film)
 The Marsh, an American theater company in San Francisco, California
 "Marsh", a song by Eminem from the album Music to Be Murdered By

Awards 
 Marsh Award for Children's Literature in Translation
 Marsh Awards for Ornithology
 Marsh Biography Award, a British literary award

Businesses 
 Marsh (company), an insurance brokerage and risk management subsidiary of Marsh & McLennan Companies
 Marsh Aviation, an American aerospace company
 Marsh Engineering Company, which designed many bridges in the United States
 Marsh Hotel, Van Wert, Ohio, United States
 Marsh Motorcycle Company, defunct American motorcycle maker formed in 1905
 Marsh Railway, Schleswig-Holstein, Germany
 Marsh Supermarkets, a former American supermarket chain based in Indianapolis, Indiana
 Marsh & McLennan Companies, a global professional services firm

People 
 Marsh (surname)
 Marsh Darling (1919–2009), Canadian ice hockey player
 Marsh Giddings (1816–1875), American politician
 Marsh Ryman (1910–1992), American collegiate hockey coach and athletic director at the University of Minnesota

Other uses 
 , a US Navy destroyer escort
 Marsh Chapel, on the campus of Boston University
 The Marsh Academy, a secondary school in New Romney, Kent, United Kingdom
 Marsh Racing, a team in the GRAND-AM Rolex Sports Car Series which formerly competed in the NASCAR Busch Series
 Marsh, a classification scheme for intestinal pathology in coeliac disease
 Marsh Mills, historic home in Maryland

See also
 Marshe (disambiguation)